The given name Carl, Carol, Carlo or Karl and surname Schmid, Schmidt or Schmitt may refer to:

Carl or Karl
Carl Schmidt (chemist) (1822–1894), Livonian chemist also known as Karl Genrikhovich Schmidt
Carl Wilhelm Schmidt (died 1864), German missionary also known as Karl Schmidt

Carl
Carl Schmitt (composer) (1837–1900), New Zealand violinist and composer
Carl Schmidt (architect) (1866–1945), Russian architect
Carl Schmidt (Coptologist) (1868–1938), German coptologist
Carl Schmidt (politician) (1835–1888), American politician
Carl Schmidt (rower) (1904–1992), Danish rower
Carl Friedrich Schmidt (geologist) (1832–1908), Baltic German geologist and botanist
Carl Schmitt (1888–1985), German jurist, political theorist and professor of law
Carl Schmitt (artist) (1889–1989), American artist and writer
Carl T. Schmidt (1906–1958), American scholar

Carlo
Carlo Schmid (German politician) (1896–1979), German academic and politician
Carlo Schmid-Sutter (1950–), Swiss politician

Carol
Carol Schmidt (1846–1928), mayor of Chișinău

Karl
Karl Patterson Schmidt (1890–1957), American herpetologist
Karl Schmid (rower) (1910–1998), Swiss rower
Karl Schmidt (footballer) (1932–2018), German footballer
Karl Schmidt-Hellerau (1873–1948), German social reformer
Karl Schmidt-Rottluff (1884–1976), German painter
Karl Schmitt-Walter (1900–1985), German operatic baritone
Karl von Schmidt (1817–1875), Prussian cavalry general
Karl Ludwig Schmidt (1891–1956), German Protestant theologian and professor of New Testament studies
Karl Schmid (artist) (1914–1998), Swiss artist

See also
Karl Schmidt Memorial, Chennai, Tamil Nadu, India, dedicated to a sailor who drowned in 1930 while saving a life